In the Night Kitchen is a children's picture book written and illustrated by Maurice Sendak, first published in hardcover in 1970 by Harper and Row. The book depicts a young boy's dream journey through a surreal baker's kitchen where he assists in the creation of a cake to be ready by the morning. In the Night Kitchen has been described by Sendak as part of a trilogy of books based on psychological development from In the Night Kitchen (toddler) to Where the Wild Things Are (pre-school) to Outside Over There (pre-adolescent). It was a Caldecott Honor recipient in 1971. It was adapted into a five-minute animated short film on January 1, 1987 directed by Gene Deitch and released by Weston Woods. The book drew controversy in the US due to depictions of nudity.

Plot summary
The main character is a young boy named Mickey who, while sleeping in his bed, is disturbed by noise on a lower floor. Suddenly, he begins to float, and loses all of his clothes as he drifts into a surreal world called the "Night Kitchen".

He falls naked into a giant mixing pot that contains the batter for the "morning cake". While Mickey is buried in the mass, three identical bakers (who closely resemble Oliver Hardy) mix the batter and prepare it for baking, unaware (or unconcerned) that there is a little boy inside. Just before the baking pan is placed into the oven, the boy emerges from the pan, protesting that he is not the batter's milk.

To make up for the baking ingredient deficiency, Mickey (now wearing a body suit of batter from the neck down) constructs an airplane out of bread dough so he can use the measuring cup as a hat and fly to the mouth of a gigantic milk bottle. Upon reaching the bottle's opening, he dives in and briefly revels in the liquid. After his covering of batter disintegrates, making him naked again, he pours the needed milk in a cascade down to the bakers who joyfully finish making their morning cake.

With dawn breaking, the naked Mickey crows like a rooster and slides down the side of the bottle, back into his bed, where he is clothed again, "cake-free and dried".

Controversy
When Mickey (who looks to be about three years old) enters the Night Kitchen, he loses his pajamas and is fully naked in some parts of the story. Critics object to Mickey's nudity which depicts not only his buttocks, but also his genitals. Some also interpret sexual innuendo in the events, with the nudity, free-flowing milky fluids, and a giant (allegedly phallic) milk bottle. As a result, the book proved controversial in the United States on its release and has continued to be so. The inclusion of child nudity has been frequently raised as morally problematic; consequently, this book remains on lists of books either challenged or banned.

The book has been ranked 25th on the "100 Most Frequently Challenged Books of 1990–2000" list compiled by the American Library Association.

Artwork
Sendak's illustrations here are rather different in style from Where the Wild Things Are, his best known book, which makes much use of cross hatching not found here. However, Sendak continues to utilize specific color tones and drawing a dream environment around a young child. Sendak's unique style captures the spirit and feeling of a dream, as Mickey floats, flies and dances from one panel to the next.

The book may be defined as a comic story, at least if one uses the definition of comics proposed in Scott McCloud's acclaimed Understanding Comics — the storytelling is mainly pictorial (albeit clarified by captions) and the images mainly sequential, and speech balloons are used throughout the entire book.

In fact, the imagery is very similar to Winsor McCay's Sunday comic strip series Little Nemo from the early 20th century. Maurice Sendak has cited these comics as influential in his work, and on page five of Night Kitchen, one of the ingredients shown has a subtitle saying "Chicken Little, Nemo, mass", a nod to this influence.

In an interview on NPR's Fresh Air in 2006, Sendak said that his depiction of the cooks in In the Night Kitchen (with their Hitler-esque mustaches) and the fact that they tried to cook the boy in their ovens were references to the Holocaust, a subject high in his thoughts, especially due to his Jewish heritage. Sendak also said the story dealt with the things that happen after a child goes to bed.

Awards received
Written in 1970, it has received the following awards:
1971 Caldecott Honor Book
Notable Children's Books of 1940—1970 (ALA)
Best Books of 1970 (SLJ)
Outstanding Children's Books of 1970 (NYT)
Best Illustrated Children's Books of 1970 (NYT)
Children's Books of 1970 (Library of Congress)
Carey-Thomas Award 1971—Honor Citation
Brooklyn Art Books for Children 1973, 1975

See also

1970 in literature
Children's literature
List of most commonly challenged books in the United States

References

External links
 

American picture books
Picture books by Maurice Sendak
1970 children's books
Books by Maurice Sendak
Caldecott Honor-winning works
Obscenity controversies in literature
Harper & Row books
Children's books adapted into films